Cosentinia is a genus of ferns in the subfamily Pteridoideae of the family Pteridaceae with a single species Cosentinia vellea. Its native distribution ranges from the Canary Islands through Europe, northern Africa and Western Asia to the west Himalayas in the Indian subcontinent.

Subspecies
, the Checklist of Ferns and Lycophytes of the World recognized two subspecies:
Cosentinia vellea subsp. bivalens (Reichstein) Rivas Mart. & Salvo
Cosentinia vellea subsp. vellea

References

Pteridaceae
Monotypic fern genera